The Takoma Avenue Historic District is a national historic district located at Takoma Park, Montgomery County, Maryland. The homes feature mid-century modern design. All five houses were constructed in 1951, are identical in their layout and construction, and were designed by Charles M. Goodman. In Goodman's parlance, the house was titled "Unit House No. 1-2L" (presumably, Unit No. 1 with two levels).  The houses exhibit the "open floor plan", walls of glass, natural light, cathedral and cantilever ceilings, prominent brick fireplace, cedar wood paneling that was characteristic of all of Goodman's modernist work. This flexible plan facilitated a more casual style of living, and responded to the changing status of women by integrating the kitchen area into the activities of the household.

It was listed on the National Register of Historic Places in 2004.

References

External links

, including photo in 2003, at Maryland Historical Trust website
Boundary Map of the Takoma Avenue Historic District, Montgomery County, at Maryland Historical Trust

Historic districts on the National Register of Historic Places in Maryland
Houses completed in 1951
Historic districts in Montgomery County, Maryland
Houses on the National Register of Historic Places in Maryland
Houses in Montgomery County, Maryland
Takoma Park, Maryland
National Register of Historic Places in Montgomery County, Maryland